William Henry Duignan (16 August 1824 – 27 March 1914) was a solicitor who lived in and around the town of Walsall for his entire life.  He was better known as an antiquarian, writer, historian and local politician and wrote a number of books and pamphlets about local history and especially on the etymology of place naming, many of which are still available today.

Life
Duignan was born of Irish descent in Walsall in 1824; his grandfather, latterly a master at Walsall Grammar School, had emigrated to England from County Longford.
He had three children, Florency-Mary, Ernest-Henry, and George-Stubbs, by Mary Minors, of Fisherwick, whom he married in 1850; and a further three children, Bernard, Carl, and Oscar, by Jenny Petersen, of Stockholm, whom he married in 1868.
An antiquarian and etymologist, he wrote three histories of place names and a monograph on Rushall Hall, where he had lived for 29 years.
He travelled widely around Britain and Ireland, earning the nickname "the man on a tricycle" after his preferred mode of travel.  He was often accompanied in his travels by the Staffordshire businessman and writer Willam Henry Robinson.

Works 
Duignan's most widely known works are his three etymologies of place names in the West Midlands, Notes on Staffordshire Place Names (1902), Worcestershire Place Names (1905), and Warwickshire Place Names (1912); all are still available in reproduction form today.

Arms

References

Bibliography 
 Notes on Staffordshire Place Names (1902) 
 Worcestershire Place Names (1905) 
 A Forgotten Worcestershire Monastery (1910)
 Warwickshire Place Names (1912)

Further reading 
 

1824 births
1914 deaths
People from Walsall
British solicitors
British antiquarians
British historians